Gerda Gräfin Paumgarten-Hohenschwangau (4 February 1907 in Graz – 1 January 2000 in Vienna) was an Austrian alpine skier and world champion. 

Paumgarten received a gold medal at the 1936 World Championships in Innsbruck, winning the slalom event. She was the younger sister of Olympic skier Harald Paumgarten (1904-1952).

References

External links 
 

1907 births
2000 deaths
Austrian female alpine skiers
Sportspeople from Graz
20th-century Austrian women